Our Music is a studio album by Jamaican reggae singer Burning Spear. It was released on September 20, 2005 through Burning Music. Recording sessions took place at the Magic Shop Recording Studio in New York City.

The album was nominated for a Grammy Award for Best Reggae Album at the 48th Annual Grammy Awards in 2006.

Track listing

Personnel

Winston Rodney – lead vocals, background vocals, percussion, arranger
Num Heru-ur Shutef Amon'Tehu – background vocals, percussion
Marie Della Thomas – background vocals
Joanne Williams – background vocals
Patrick Gordon – background vocals
Simone Gordon – background vocals
Melanie Lynch – background vocals
Celia Chavez – background vocals
Michael Hyde – keyboards
Earl Appleton – keyboards (tracks: 10, 11)
Ian "Beezy" Coleman – lead guitar, rhythm guitar, bass guitar
Donovan Mackity – lead guitar
Andy Bassford – lead guitar
Chino Smith – lead guitar
Cecil Ordonez – lead guitar (track 7)
Linford Carby – rhythm guitar
I Palmer – bass guitar
David Rekhley – bass guitar (tracks: 10, 11)
Leroy "Horsemouth" Wallace – drums
Karl W. Wright – drums (tracks: 10, 11)
Jerry Johnson – saxophone
Jason Jackson – trombone
Kevin Batchelor – trumpet
Barry O'Hare – recording
Benedetto Antonio Caccavale – assistant engineering
Chris Gehringer – mastering
Mark Seliger – photography
Carter Van Pelt – footage

Chart history

References

External links

2005 albums
Burning Spear albums